Patrick Colwell (born ) is an American former politician in the state of Maine. A Democrat, he was Speaker of the Maine House of Representatives from 2003-2004 (121st Maine State Legislature). He represented Gardiner and part of Randolph in Kennebec County.

Personal
He was married to Rebecca, with whom he has one child. Born in Machias, Maine, he is a ceramic tile contractor by profession.

References

1950s births
Living people
People from Gardiner, Maine
Speakers of the Maine House of Representatives
Democratic Party members of the Maine House of Representatives
Majority leaders of the Maine House of Representatives
Businesspeople from Maine